Malaysia–Tajikistan relations  are foreign relations between Malaysia and Tajikistan. Malaysian embassy in Tashkent, Uzbekistan is also accredited to Tajikistan, while Tajikistan has an embassy in Ampang, Selangor. Both countries have been enjoying warm diplomatic relations and are willing to make constructive efforts towards progress.

History 
Relations between the two countries has been established since 11 March 1992. In 2014, the President of Tajikistan Emomali Rahmon together with his wife made an official visit to Malaysia at the invitation of Yang di-Pertuan Agong Tuanku Abdul Halim Mu'adzam Shah.

Economic relations 
Trade relations between the two countries recorded a total of $5.5 billion in 2013 and a number of Malaysian firms are keen to explore business opportunities in Tajikistan. Both countries agreed to expand the co-operation mainly in expansion of political, economic, investment, trade, scientific, technical and cultural co-operation as stated by the Prime Minister of Malaysia Najib Razak during his meeting with Emomali. Aside from that, five memorandum of understandings (MoUs) on bilateral consultation, co-operation in the fields of higher education, tourism, physical training and sports, MoU with the Olympic Council of Malaysia (OCM) and the agreement on economic, technical and scientific co-operation was signed. In 2013, Malaysia is expected to build a power plant with a capacity of 300 megawatt in northern Tajikistan.

Education relations 
There are more than 200 Tajiks who pursue their study and undergo training at Malaysian universities and educational institutions. Tajikistan's Ministry of Education and Science also have signed an MoU with the Malaysian Limkokwing University of Creative Technology to establish a LUCT branch in Tajikistan.

Further reading 
 Joint statement between the Republic of Tajikistan and Malaysia on occasion of the state visit of his Excellency Emomali Rahmon, president of the Republic of Tajikistan to Malaysia, 22 – 25 june 2014 Embassy of Tajikistan to the United States of America

References 

 
Tajikistan
Bilateral relations of Tajikistan